This is a list of the state symbols of the U.S. state of Wisconsin.

Insignia

Species

Geology

Culture

References 

State symbols
Wisconsin